General Todorov is a village in Petrich Municipality, in Blagoevgrad Province, Bulgaria. Before 1984, it was known as Pripechene. As of 2013, it had a population of 668.

History

The previous name of the village is Pripechene. During the Ottoman period, the village had a mixed Bulgarian and Turkish population. According to an Ottoman document from 1519 there were 6 Muslim and 39 non-Muslim households in Pripechene. The main occupation of the population in Pripechene was farming rice. A Vasil Kanchov study of 1900 counted 114 Bulgarian and 70 Turkish inhabitants. 

The village was renamed General Todorov after general Georgi Todorov in 1984.

References

Villages in Blagoevgrad Province